Henri du Vergier, comte de la Rochejaquelein (30 August 1772 – 28 January 1794) was the youngest general of the Royalist Vendéan insurrection during the French Revolution. At the age of 21, he served as commander-in-chief of the Catholic and Royal Army.

Biography

Early activities
Born in the Château de la Durbellière, Saint-Aubin-de-Baubigné, near Châtillon, La Rochejaquelein joined the Royal Polish Regiment, of which his father was colonel, in 1787. In February 1789 he became a member of the Flanders regiment of chasseurs. In March 1792 he became a member of the Constitutional Guard, charged with protecting the King of France. He fought for the first time defending the Tuileries Palace on the 10 August 1792 attack, as an officer of the Constitutional Guard of King Louis XVI.

Returning to his home province, he refused to comply with the levée en masse called by the outbreak of the French Revolutionary Wars and  joined his cousin Louis Marie de Lescure on the latter's estates in Poitou.

Rebellion

Resistance to conscription soon escalated into a full rebellion, known as the War in the Vendée. Soon after, De la Rochejaquelein and his compatriots started fighting the troops of the French Republic with Maurice d'Elbée and the Marquis de Bonchamps from April 1793. There, he gave his famous order, "Mes amis, si j'avance, suivez-moi! Si je recule, tuez-moi! Si je meurs, vengez-moi!" (literal translation: "Friends, if I advance, follow me! If I retreat, kill me! If I die, avenge me!").

Leading a few thousand Vendéan peasants, De la Rochejaquelein gained his first victory over the French Revolutionary Army on 13 April, took part to the taking of Bressuire on 3 May, in the Battle of Fontenay-le-Comte on 25 May and in the Battle of Saumur on 9 June. At Fontenay he was famous for his contempt for danger, wearing three red handkerchiefs; on his head, around his neck and at his waist to defy the Republican gunners. After Fontenay his companions decided that they would also wear three red handkerchiefs so that De la Rochejacquelin could not be singled out.

In August, after the Battle of Luçon, he regrouped the Vendéan army, which was on the verge of being disbanded, and won the Battle of Chantonnay on 5 September. On 13 September the thumb of his right hand was shattered by a bullet during an engagement with Republicans at Martigné-Briand but he continued to fire at his opponents. His famous portrait by Pierre-Narcisse Guérin shows him with his right arm in a sling, shooting with his left hand. He had to retreat across the Loire after being beaten in the Second Battle of Cholet, on 17 October.

Final months

On 20 October, De la Rochejaquelein was unanimously elected as commander-in-chief of the Catholic and Royal Army, replacing D'Elbée who had been severely wounded in Cholet. However, his bravery did not compensate for his lack of experience and strategic skills. He marched onto Granville, took Avranches on 12 November but failed to seize Granville and retreated to Angers in order to cross the Loire.

Larger forces under François Séverin Marceau, Jean Baptiste Kléber, and François Joseph Westermann gave chase, defeating him once in Le Mans on 12 December and again, more severely, on 23 December in Savenay. After this decisive rout, the Catholic and Royal Army was no longer a fighting force; De la Rochejacquelein had to take to the woods disguised as a peasant. He managed to save the remains of his army by crossing the Loire, and left under the criticism of his fellow companions.

While trying to pursue a guerrilla war against the Republicans, he was killed by a Republican soldier near Nuaillé on 28 January 1794. On a reconnaissance mission he had spotted two Republican soldiers who pretended to surrender to him, but then shot him in the forehead. His brother Louis became the head of the royalists in Vendée in 1813 and furthered the royalist cause there during the Hundred Days period. He fell in battle at Pont-de-Mathis on 4 June 1815.

Notes

References

External links
 http://nobility.org/2011/02/03/larochejacquelein-is-killed-by-the-men-whose-life-he-spared/

1772 births
1794 deaths
People from Deux-Sèvres
Henri de la
French counter-revolutionaries
French monarchists
French Roman Catholics
French Ultra-royalists
 Cent
Royalist military leaders of the War in the Vendée
French Royalist military leaders killed in the French Revolutionary Wars